Onze-Lieve-Vrouwekerk (Church of Our Lady) is a common church dedication in Belgium and the Netherlands and may refer to:

Cathedral of Our Lady (Antwerp), Belgium
Church of Our Lady (Bruges), Belgium
Church of Our Lady (Kortrijk), Belgium
Church of Our Lady of Laeken, Belgium
Kerk van Onze-Lieve-Vrouw-over-de-Dijle, Mechelen, Belgium
Basiliek van Onze-Lieve-Vrouw-van-Hanswijk, Mechelen, Belgium
Church of Our Lady, Melsele, Belgium
Basilica of Our Lady of Scherpenheuvel, Belgium
Onze-Lieve-Vrouwekerk, Sint-Niklaas, Belgium
Lievenvrouwenkerk, Sint-Truiden, Belgium
Onze-Lieve-Vrouwe Basiliek, Tongeren, Belgium
Onze-Lieve-Vrouwekerk, Vilvoorde, Belgium
Onze Lieve Vrouwetoren, Amersfoort, Netherlands
Church of Our Lady (Amsterdam), Netherlands
Grote kerk (Breda), Netherlands
Vrouwekerk, Leiden, Netherlands
Basilica of Our Lady (Maastricht), Netherlands